V. K. Munusamy also known as V. K. Munusamy Krishnapakthar is an Indian Terracotta artist. He won Padma Shri award in the year 2020 for his work in the field of Terracotta Artistry.

References 

Recipients of the Padma Shri in arts
Terracotta
Year of birth missing (living people)
Living people

Indian male artists